Uva is an unincorporated community in Marion County, Missouri, United States.

An early variant name was "Mount Zion Community", after a nearby church of that name. A post office called Uva was established in 1898, and remained in operation until 1901. It is unknown why the name "Uva" was applied to this community.

Notes

Unincorporated communities in Marion County, Missouri
Unincorporated communities in Missouri